Winogradskyella flava is a Gram-negative and aerobic bacterium from the genus of Winogradskyella which has been isolated from the alga Sargassum fulvellum from the South Sea in Korea.

References

Flavobacteria
Bacteria described in 2017